Ratna Chuli is a mountain peak in the Himalayas on the border of Nepal and Tibet Autonomous Region.

Location 

Climbing history 
The first ascent was in 1996, by a Japanese team, via the west ridge.

References

Manang District, Nepal
Mountains of the Himalayas
Wikipedia requested photographs by location
Seven-thousanders of the Himalayas
Mountains of Nepal